Gary Barrow (born 18 January 1970) is a former Australian rules footballer who played with Footscray in the Australian Football League (AFL).

Barrow, who was recruited from Avondale Heights, played initially for Essendon, but didn't play a senior AFL game for the club. He went to Footscray in the 1991 National Draft and made two league appearances late in the 1992 AFL season. In 1993 he played four games, also late in the season.

References

External links
 
 

1970 births
Australian rules footballers from Victoria (Australia)
Western Bulldogs players
Living people